Merodoras nheco is  species of freshwater ray-finned fish, it is the only species in the genus Merodoras of the catfish (order Siluriformes) family Doradidae.

Taxonomy
Merodoras and its type species M. nheco were described in 2007. It belongs to the subfamily Astrodoradinae. This genus is most closely related to Amblydoras.

Distribution and habitat
Merodoras nheco inhabits a flooded portion of the upper Paraguay River basin in western Brazil called the Pantanal Matogrossense. Here it lives in the lentic lakes in flooded areas.

Appearance and anatomy
M. nheco is like other doradids. It has three pairs of barbels (one pair maxillary, two pairs mental), strong dorsal and pectoral fin spines. M. nheco is differentiated from all other doradids by having its scutes with thorns directed ventrally in adults, and from all doradids except Physopyxis cristata by having an incomplete lateral line. It has a smooth dorsal fin spine, as opposed to a serrated one; the only other genus with smooth dorsal fin spines is Anadoras. Also, it has a truncated caudal fin. This species grows to a length of  SL.

Ecology
M. nheco is fed upon by southern caimans (Caiman crocodilus yacare) when its habitat dries over the winter, which makes these fish easier to catch. These fish are often hosts to tongue worms, which inhabit their swim bladders.

References

Doradidae
Freshwater fish of Brazil
Endemic fauna of Brazil
Taxa named by Horacio Higuchi
Taxa named by José Luis Olivan Birindelli
Taxa named by Leandro Melo de Sousa
Taxa named by Heraldo Antonio Britski
Fish described in 2007